Angela Lawson (born January 19, 1966) is the senior associate director of athletics at the University of the Incarnate Word. She played college basketball at Louisiana Tech University where she was a three-year starter for Leon Barmore and the Lady Techsters and won the 1988 NCAA Division I National Championship in her senior season. Lawson went to the University of Tennessee to earn a master's degree and serve as a graduate assistant for Pat Summitt and the Lady Vols. In her second season as GA, Tennessee won the 1991 NCAA Division I National Championship. Lawson then took an assistant coaching position at Texas State, which she served for 3 seasons. Then she took an assistant coaching position at Baylor with former Louisiana Tech coach Sonja Hogg. After serving 6 years at Baylor, Lawson took the head coaching position which at the University of the Incarnate Word until 2013.

References

http://www.cardinalathletics.com/coaches.aspx?rc=62&path=wbball

1966 births
Living people
American women's basketball coaches
American women's basketball players
Basketball coaches from Texas
Louisiana Tech Lady Techsters basketball players
Baylor Bears women's basketball coaches
People from Longview, Texas
Tennessee Lady Volunteers basketball coaches
Texas State Bobcats women's basketball coaches
Incarnate Word Cardinals women's basketball coaches